The Badger Face Welsh Mountain (Welsh Defaid Idloes ; also known as Badger Faced Welsh Mountain or Welsh Badger-faced) is a distinct variety of the Welsh Mountain breed of domestic sheep bred for sheep farming in Wales. It is a hardy upland breed known for producing a high percentage of twins and triplets under good conditions. It appears in two sub-varieties of its own: the Torddu ("black-bellied"), which has a white fleece with dark face and belly, and the Torwen ("white-bellied"), which has a black body with a white belly and white stripes over the eyes. The Torddu is the more common of the two types. In both types, ewes are polled and rams are horned. Although this breed grows wool, it is primarily raised for meat.

Characteristics
This breed is extremely hardy and able to graze rough hills and terrain.  On average at maturity, rams weigh  and ewes .

References

External links

 The Badger Face Welsh Mountain Sheep Society

Sheep breeds originating in Wales
Sheep breeds